The Mocímboa da Praia offensive was a six day long offensive in northern Mozambique by Islamic State's Central African Province (IS-CAP) to capture the town of 30,000. The offensive, part of the insurgency in Cabo Delgado, was a major success for IS-CAP, as they captured Mocímboa da Praia.

Offensive 
The offensive actions started on August 5, 2020 when IS-CAP insurgents attacked the villages of Anga, 1 de Maio, Awasse, and the outskirts of Mocímboa da Praia on the same night. On August 6, IS-CAP attacked two military bases in Mocímboa da Praia, killing or wounding 50 soldiers and seizing dozens of rifles and RPG-7s. The government also repeated an attempted assault on the city, killing 16 insurgents. On August 8, the government pulled out of Ntotue, a strategic town in between Mocímboa da Praia and Awasse. On August 9, IS-CAP took the town of Awasse and were in control of the outskirts of Mocímboa da Praia. A well-carried out ambush took place on Sunday just before Awasse, killing 55 recruits and injuring 90 more. By the 10th the city of Mocímboa da Praia was completely cut off from food and ammunition. South Africa's Dyck Advisory Group attempted to airdrop ammunition onto the city under siege but dropped it too far from the Mozambican military. As a result, the Mozambicans suffered casualties trying to recover the supplies. On Tuesday, August 11, the Mozambican army, outnumbered and low on ammunition, was forced to retreat by boat from the city. In the retreat, an HV32 interceptor vessel was hit with an RPG and sank. 55 soldiers were killed in running battles during the siege of the city. The insurgents lost a total of 70 men during the battle for the city.

Aftermath 
Following the offensive, IS-CAP declared Mocímboa da Praia its capital. Several local civilians welcomed the rebels, and were reportedly seen cheering them on. Despite attempts by the Mozambican security forces to retake the town, it remained under rebel control as of March 2021.

A combination of Rwandan and Mozambican forces launched an effort to retake the city at the beginning of August 2021.  This offensive was ultimately successful.

As Mocímboa da Praia has traditionally served as a major hub for smuggling in narcotics and minerals, observes believe that the conquest has allowed IS-CAP to impose taxes which provide it with a steady revenue stream.

See also
Battle of Palma
2021 Cabo Delgado offensives

References

2020 in Mozambique
Conflicts in 2020
Separatism in Mozambique
Cabo Delgado Province
Wars involving Mozambique